Baaziz, stage name of Abdelaziz Bekhti, (born 1963 in Cherchell, northern Algeria) is an Algerian singer and songwriter.

Early life
Though resident in France, Baaziz is one of Algeria's most outspoken singer/songwriters. Baaziz first attracted attention with his debut 1989 single, "ya Hasrah kikount Esseghir", which he based on a song by the genial Rachid Ksentini. Throughout most of his career he was banned from airplay on Algerian radio and TV. However, his most successful tune, "Algeria My Love," led to special recognition from President Bouteflika. Acceptance by the Algerian government, however, was short-lived. His decision to perform a song denouncing Algeria's generals, "Waili Waili," on a live-broadcast television show despite warnings resulted in him being censured. Though a contemporary of musicians such as Cheb Hasni, Cheba Djanet, Khaled and Faudel, Baaziz is not a singer of Raï music.

Career
In 2008 Baaziz announced his intention to stand in the forthcoming Algerian presidential election. The candidacy did not, however, materialise and he announced that he would not be supporting any of the candidates.

Discography
Chaâbi Rock'n Bled (2005)
Café de l'indépendance (2004)
Dorénavant (1999)
Coyotte
Ybip-Emmou
El-Rebelle
The Best

References

1963 births
Algerian songwriters
Living people
People from Cherchell
Kabyle people
20th-century Algerian  male singers
21st-century Algerian  male singers